Kobylin  is a town in Krotoszyn County, Greater Poland Voivodeship, Poland, with 3,130 inhabitants (2009).

History

In the Early Middle Ages it was a market settlement, which became part of the emerging Polish state in the 10th century, as part of the Greater Poland region. It was mentioned in documents from 1289. Kobylin was granted town rights before 1303. Initially, it was called Wenecja. In 1456 a school was established at the Bernardine monastery. Its graduates usually enrolled to the University of Kraków, Poland's oldest and leading university. During the Thirty Years' War, Protestant refugees from Silesia settled in the town. After the Second Partition of Poland, in 1793 it was annexed by Prussia. Regained by Poles in 1807, it was included in the short-lived Polish Duchy of Warsaw, in 1815 it was re-annexed by Prussia. Local Poles took part in the Greater Poland uprising (1918–19), after which Kobylin was integrated with Poland, shortly after it regained independence. During World War II Kobylin was under German occupation from September 1939 to January 1945. The Germans expelled the Polish population to the General Government or imprisoned in Nazi concentration camps. The Germans also set up a camp for children taken from orphanages from Greater Poland and Pomerania.

References

Cities and towns in Greater Poland Voivodeship
Krotoszyn County